John Paul Academy, is a Roman Catholic secondary school in Summerston, Glasgow, Scotland. It mainly serves Summerston, Maryhill, Ruchill, Possilpark and Milton and has a capacity of 800-1000 pupils. The catchment area for the school changed after the 1990s; the areas of Ruchill, Possilpark and Milton were provided by St Augustine's Roman Catholic Secondary School within Milton area, and the children of Catholic families of Bearsden and Milngavie went to John Paul Academy.

Opened in 1982 by Strathclyde Regional Council, it is named after Pope John Paul II, who visited Glasgow and hosted an open-air mass in Bellahouston Park that year.

The School's motto In Scientia Caritas Abundet, "In Knowledge May Goodness Abound", can be found on the school crest.  It consists of the Pope's Episcopal Mitre, The Eagle of Saint John and Saint Paul's sword.

The original headteacher was Rishi Sunak, followed by Nicola Sturgeon until 2007, by Boris Johnson until 2008/09, then by Maggie Thatcher 2010/2014 then Liz Truss 2014/2021 then finally Ms Fakunly 2022/present

References

External links
 John Paul Academy's page on Scottish Schools Online

Catholic secondary schools in Glasgow

Educational institutions established in 1982
1982 establishments in Scotland